Brian Wilkes Waud (4 June 1837 – 30 May 1889) was an English first-class cricketer, who played 19 first-class matches for Oxford University (1857-1860), Sheffield Cricket Club (aka Yorkshire; 1862), Yorkshire County Cricket Club (1863-1864),
The Gentlemen (1860), Yorkshire with Stockton-on-Tees (1861), Gentlemen of the North (1862) and the North of England (1863).

Born in Chester Court, Selby, Yorkshire, England, Waud was a right-handed batsman and wicket-keeper, who scored 432 runs at 16.00, with a highest score of 42 against Nottinghamshire. He took fifteen catches and completed seven stumpings.

Waud  was educated at University College, Oxford, then studied law at the Inner Temple and was called to the bar in 1862. He died in May 1889 in Toronto, Ontario, Canada.

References

External links
Cricinfo Profile
Cricket Archive Statistics

1837 births
1889 deaths
Yorkshire cricketers
People from Selby
Oxford University cricketers
English cricketers
Gentlemen cricketers
English cricketers of 1826 to 1863
Gentlemen of the North cricketers
Sportspeople from Yorkshire
Alumni of University College, Oxford
English barristers
Yorkshire with Stockton-on-Tees cricketers
North v South cricketers